The 1987 Virginia Slims of Indianapolis was a women's tennis tournament played on outdoor hard courts at the Indianapolis Racquet Club in Indianapolis, Indiana in the United States and was part of the Category 1+ tier of the 1987 WTA Tour. It was the eighth edition of the tournament and ran from October 25 through November 1, 1987. Unseeded Halle Cioffi won the singles title.

Finals

Singles
 Halle Cioffi defeated  Anne Smith 4–6, 6–4, 7–6(12–10)
 It was Cioffi's only title of her career.

Doubles
 Jenny Byrne /  Michelle Jaggard defeated  Beverly Bowes /  Hu Na 6–2, 6–3

References

External links
 ITF tournament edition details
 Tournament draws

Virginia Slims of Indianapolis
Virginia Slims of Indianapolis
Virginia Slims of Indianapolis
Virginia Slims of Indianapolis
Virginia Slims of Indianapolis
Virginia Slims of Indianapolis